is a Japanese professional footballer who plays as a midfielder for  club JEF United Chiba.

Club statistics
.

References

External links
Profile at JEF United Chiba

Profile at Kashiwa Reysol
Profile at Shonan Bellmare

1994 births
Living people
Association football people from Saitama Prefecture
Japanese footballers
J1 League players
J2 League players
J3 League players
Kashiwa Reysol players
Shonan Bellmare players
J.League U-22 Selection players
JEF United Chiba players
Association football midfielders